Peter Baah (born 1 May 1973) is an English former professional footballer. During his playing career, Baah played as a winger in England and the United States, before becoming a football coach.

Early and personal life
Baah was born on 1 May 1973 in Littleborough.

Career
After graduating from the youth team, Baah made one appearance in the Football League for hometown club Blackburn Rovers during the 1991–92 season. Baah then played for Fulham between 1992 and 1994, scoring 4 goals in 49 League appearances, before moving to non-League football with Northwich Victoria.

Baah later played in the US for the Indiana Blast between 1998 and 2004; he was also Head Coach from 2003 to 2004. He also played for the Cincinnati Kings in 2005.

Baah became Assistant Coach of the Minnesota Thunder in 2006, and also coached Park Tudor High School.

References

1973 births
Living people
English footballers
English football managers
Blackburn Rovers F.C. players
Fulham F.C. players
Northwich Victoria F.C. players
Indiana Blast players
Cincinnati Kings players
English Football League players
A-League (1995–2004) players
USL League Two players
Association football wingers
English expatriate sportspeople in the United States
Expatriate soccer players in the United States
English expatriate footballers